William Bradford Reynolds (June 21, 1942 – September 14, 2019) was an American attorney who served as the United States Assistant Attorney General for the Civil Rights Division from 1981 to 1988.

Reynolds was Senior Counsel in BakerBotts Antitrust and Competition division. He graduated with a LL.B. from Vanderbilt University Law School in 1967 where he was Order of the Coif and Editor-in-Chief of the Vanderbilt Law Review.  In 1964, he received a B.A. from Yale University.

He died of cancer on September 14, 2019, in Seabrook Island, South Carolina at age 77.

Further reading
 Raymond Wolters. 1996. Right Turn: William Bradford Reynolds, the Reagan Administration, and Black Civil Rights. Routledge.

References

External links

1942 births
2019 deaths
United States Assistant Attorneys General for the Civil Rights Division
Yale University alumni
Vanderbilt University Law School alumni
People associated with Baker Botts
Reagan administration personnel